The Fox Commercial Building is a historic building in Tucson, Arizona. It was designed by architect M. Eugene Durfee in the Art Deco style, and built in 1929. It has been listed on the National Register of Historic Places since April 6, 2004.

References

National Register of Historic Places in Pima County, Arizona
Art Deco architecture in Arizona
Commercial buildings completed in 1929
1929 establishments in Arizona